William Dempsey Valgardson (born 7 May 1939) is an Icelandic-Canadian fiction writer and poet. He was a long-time professor of writing at the University of Victoria in British Columbia and a professor of English at Cottey College in Nevada, Missouri.

Valgardson was born in Winnipeg, Manitoba, of Icelandic descent, and raised in Gimli, Manitoba. He completed his BA at United College, BEd at the University of Manitoba, and his MFA at the University of Iowa.

His writing often focuses on cultural differences and involve irony and symbolism. His short stories involve normal people in normal situations, who, under certain circumstances, lead unusual and surprising lives.

Valgardson has won numerous awards and accolades including the Ethel Wilson Fiction Prize for The Girl With the Botticelli Face (1992) and the Books in Canada First Novel Award for Gentle Sinners (1980). His short story Bloodflowers was included in Best American Short Stories 1971.

Bibliography
Bloodflowers: Ten Stories short stories - Oberon Press, 1973
The Job Anthology, Toronto, CBC radio
God is Not a Fish Inspector short stories - Oberon Press, 1975
In The Gutting Shed poetry - Turnstone Press, 1976
Beyond Normal Requirements Anthology, Toronto, CBC radio, 1977
Í Manitoba Utvarp Reykjavik, Rikis Utvarpid, Reykjavik, Iceland June 11, 1977
Red Dust short stories - Oberon Press, 1978
God is Not a Fish Inspector film Allan Kroeker, Dept.of Education, Manitoba, 1980.
Gentle Sinners novel - Oberon Press,1980
The Burning CBC Radio, Vancouver, 1981

Bloodflowers Stereo Sound Stage, CBC radio, Toronto, Oct. 30, 1982
The Pedlar based on "A Place of One's Own", film Directed by: Allan Kroeker Produced by: Michael Scott 1982, 54 min 32 s
Gentle Sinners CBC film 105 min, Director: Eric Till, 1983
Bloodflowers Sundary Matinee, Toronto, CBC radio, March 6, 1983
Granite Point Saturday Stereo Theatre, Toronto, CBC radio, Oct. 29 1983
The Cave Vanishing Point, Toronto CBC Radio, Dec. 28, 1985
An Unacceptable Standard of Cockpit Practice Disasters, CBC radio, Vancouver, 1985
Sælir eru einfaldirIcelandic National Radio, Reykjavik, Iceland, May 3–31, 1985
The Carpenter of Dreams : poems—Victoria, B.C. : Skaldhus Press, c1986
Bloðrot Icelandic National Radio, Reykjavik, Iceland, July 27, 1986
Carpenter of Dreams Sextet, Sunday Matinee, CBC Radio, Feb. 15, 1987
Seiche State of the Arts, CBC Radio, Jan. 10, 1987
Ukrainian Journey Morningside, CBC Radio, Jan. 22–26, 5 parts, 1987
Blóðrót, islensk þýðing Guðrúnar Guðmundsdóttir, ásamt inngangi eftir Harald Bessason—Kópavogi:Sigmar Þormar, 1989.
What Can't Be Changed Shouldn't Be Mourned short stories, Douglas&McIntyre, 1990
The Man From Snaefellsness Stereo Theatre, CBC Radio, (2 hour drama), Oct. 6, 13, 1991
Wrinkles Arts Encounters, CBC Radio, Winnipeg, 1991
The Girl With the Botticelli Face novel, Douglas&McIntyre, 1992
The Girl With The Botticelli Face Between The Covers, CBC, Toronto, Oct. 4–22, 1993
Thor children's picture book, illustrated by Ange Zhang - Groundwood, 1994
The Hockey Fan - 1st ed. -- Victoria [B.C.] : Published for the Hawthorne Society by Reference West, c1994
The Girl With The Botticelli Face On The Arts, CBC Radio, April 18, 25, 1994
The Man Who Was Always Running Out of Toilet Paper Icelandic National Radio, Reykjavik, Iceland, trans Solveig Jonsdóttir, Sept., 1994
The Girl With The Botticelli Face The Australian Broadcasting Corporation, Nov. 10, 17 Nov. 11, 18, 1994
Stúlkan með Botticelli andlitið novel, Þýðing, Gunar Gunnarsson og Hildur Finnsdóttir. -- Seltjarnarnes [Iceland]: Ormstunga, c1995
Ingibjorg's Christmas Gift performed by the Inuvik Choral and Theatrical Society, CBC North Radio, Dec. 18, 19, 20, 1995
Winter Rescue illustrated by Ange Zhang. 1st U.S. ed. 1995. -- New York : Margaret K. McElderry Books, 1995, c1994.
Sarah and the People of Sand River children's picture book, illustrations by Ian Wallace - Groundwood, 1996
Thor teikningar eftir Ange Zhang; Guðrun B. Guðsteinsdóttir, Íslenkaði—Seltjarnarnes [Iceland]: Ormstunga, 1996
Garbage Creek and Other Stories young people's short stories - Groundwood, 1997
Sarah och folket frán Sand River children's picture book, illustrations by Ian Wallace : till svenska av Aziza Xenia Dhaouadi—Stockholm: Eriksson&Lindgren, 1998
The Divorced Kids Club short stories for junior high - Groundwood, 1998
A Matter of Balance CBC Radio, Toronto, 1999
Un visage 'a la Botticelli roman; traduit de l'anglais par Jean Chapdelaine Gagnon -- [Montreal]: Les Herbes rouges, 2001
Frances novel for junior high - Groundwood, 2002
What Can't Be Changed Shouldn't Be Mourned [electronic resource]. -- New York : Douglas & McIntyre, 2009.
What The Bear Said: Skald tales from New Iceland folk tales from Lake Winnipeg - Turnstone Press, 2011

References

External links
 W. D. Valgardson in The Canadian Encyclopedia
 Valgardson at Encyclopedia.com
 Tolerance, intolerance, and fanaticism, W.D. Valgardson's reaction to the religious debate in New Iceland – Anderson, Erla Louise Colwill – 2000-05-01 at FGS Electronic Theses and Dissertations, University of Manitoba Faculty of Graduate Studies
 

1939 births
Canadian male novelists
Canadian people of Icelandic descent
Cottey College faculty
Academic staff of the University of Victoria
Iowa Writers' Workshop alumni
People from Gimli, Manitoba
Writers from Winnipeg
Living people
Amazon.ca First Novel Award winners